The men's team épée was a fencing event held as part of the Fencing at the 1912 Summer Olympics programme. It was the second appearance of the event, which had been introduced in 1908.

Rosters

Results

Quarterfinals

Semifinals

Final

References

Sources
 
 

Fencing at the 1912 Summer Olympics